= Gregorius Van Hoorde =

Dominican hagiographer

Gregorius Van Hoorde was an 18th-century Dominican hagiographer from Ghent in the Austrian Netherlands (now Belgium). He was the author of a life of Thomas Aquinas.

== Works ==
- Leven van den heyligen en engelschen leeraer Thomas van Aquinen (Ghent, Augustinus Graet, 1718).
